The Cedar Grove Schools are a comprehensive community public school district that serves students in pre-kindergarten through twelfth grade from Cedar Grove, in Essex County, New Jersey, United States.

As of the 2020–21 school year, the district, comprised of four schools, had an enrollment of 1,602 students and 152.0 classroom teachers (on an FTE basis), for a student–teacher ratio of 10.5:1.

The district is classified by the New Jersey Department of Education as being in District Factor Group "I", the second-highest of eight groupings. District Factor Groups organize districts statewide to allow comparison by common socioeconomic characteristics of the local districts. From lowest socioeconomic status to highest, the categories are A, B, CD, DE, FG, GH, I and J.

Awards and recognition
In September 2021, North End School was one of nine schools in New Jersey recognized by the National Blue Ribbon Schools Program.

Schools
Schools in the district (with 2020–21 enrollment data from the National Center for Education Statistics) are:
Elementary schools
North End Elementary School with 278 students in grades PreK-4
Traci Dyer, Principal
South End Elementary School with 332 students in grades PreK-4
Lynn DiMatteo, Principal
Middle school
Cedar Grove Memorial Middle School with 454 students in grades 5-8
Nicholas DeCorte, Principal
High school
Cedar Grove High School with 507students in grades 9-12
Dustin Bayer, Principal

Administration
Core members of the district's administration are:
Anthony Grosso, Superintendent
Michael DeVita, Business Administrator / Board Secretary

Board of education
The district's board of education is comprised of five members who set policy and oversee the fiscal and educational operation of the district through its administration. As a Type II school district, the board's trustees are elected directly by voters to serve three-year terms of office on a staggered basis, with either one or two seats up for election each year held (since 2012) as part of the November general election. The board appoints a superintendent to oversee the day-to-day operation of the district.

References

External links 
Cedar Grove Schools website
 
School Data for the Cedar Grove Schools, National Center for Education Statistics

Cedar Grove, New Jersey
New Jersey District Factor Group I
School districts in Essex County, New Jersey